Mexican film director Alfonso Cuarón has received many awards and nominations over the course of his career.

Major Associations

Academy Awards

British Academy Film Awards

Golden Globe Awards

Guilds

ACE Eddie Awards

ASC Awards

Directors Guild Awards

Producers Guild Awards

Writers Guild Awards

Industry Awards

AACTA Awards

BAFTA Children's Awards

Independent Spirit Awards

Satellite Awards

Saturn Awards

Film Festival Awards

Venice Film Festival

Morelia International Film Festival

Palm Springs International Film Festival

Other Awards

Argentine Film Critics Association Awards

British Independent Film Awards

Critics' Choice Awards

Dallas–Fort Worth Film Critics Association Awards
 Dallas–Fort Worth Film Critics Association

Empire Awards

Florida Film Critics Circle Awards
 Florida Film Critics Circle

Grammy Awards 

 Grammy Awards

Houston Film Critics Society Awards
 Houston Film Critics Society

International Online Film Critics' Poll Awards

Los Angeles Film Critics Association Awards
 Los Angeles Film Critics Association

National Board of Review Awards

New York Film Critics Circle Awards

San Diego Film Critics Society Awards
 San Diego Film Critics Society

San Francisco Bay Area Film Critics Circle Awards
 San Francisco Bay Area Film Critics Circle

Seattle Film Critics Society Awards
 Seattle Film Critics Society

Directed Academy Award performances
Cuaron has directed multiple nominated performances.

References

Cuaron, Alfonso